Saperda candida, the roundheaded appletree borer, is a species of beetle in the family Cerambycidae. It was described by Johan Christian Fabricius in 1787. It is known from Canada and the United States. It contains the varietas Saperda candida var. bipunctata.

Saperda candida is preyed upon by the parasitoid wasp species Cenocoelius saperdae.

References

candida
Beetles described in 1787